Yamuna Pushkaram is a festival of River Yamuna normally occurs once in 12 years. This Pushkaram is observed for a period  of 12 days from the time of entry of Jupiter into Karka rasi (Cancer).

See also 
Kumbh Mela
Godavari Pushkaralu
Pushkaram

References

Religious festivals in India
Water and Hinduism
Hindu festivals
Religious tourism in India
Hindu pilgrimages